TigriSat is a CubeSat built in 2014 by a team of Iraqi students at the La Sapienza University of Rome. It uses an RGB camera to detect dust storms over Iraq, and transmits the data to ground stations in Baghdad and Rome. It is considered Iraq's first satellite. It was launched from Orenburg on June 19, 2014 on a Dnepr launch vehicle. It was deployed using a UniSat-6. As of July 2019, it remains operational.

History 
In 1989, under Saddam Hussein's government, Iraq claimed to have launched a satellite. However, footage showed that the launch vehicle exploded early in liftoff, and called into question whether the launch was an attempted orbital launch. Thus, this satellite is the first launched for Iraq. Its launch, at the time, was record-breaking for the greatest number of satellites launched on a single rocket. In 2018, this satellite's signal was briefly mistaken for that of another CubeSat, PicSat.

See also
Al-Ta'ir

References 

CubeSats
Satellites of Iraq
Satellites of Italy
Spacecraft launched in 2014
2014 in Iraq
2014 in Italy
First artificial satellites of a country